Evy-Ann Midttun (1943–2011) was a Norwegian politician for the Labour Party.

She started her political career in Alta, and was a county councillor (fylkesråd) in Finnmark County Municipality from 1988 to 1995. From 1995 to 2003 she was the county mayor (fylkesordfører) of Finnmark. She died in 2011.

References

1943 births
2011 deaths
People from Alta, Norway
Labour Party (Norway) politicians
Chairmen of County Councils of Norway
Finnmark politicians
Women mayors of places in Norway
20th-century Norwegian women politicians
20th-century Norwegian politicians